Ngangbam Soniya Chanu  (born 15 February 1980) is an Indian Woman Weightlifter. She won the silver medal in the Women's 48 kg category at the 2010 Commonwealth Games.

She is from Imphal West district of Manipur state of India.

2012 Summer Olympics

She represented India, in 2012 Summer Olympics in Women's 48 kg. She finished with 7th position.

References

Commonwealth Games silver medallists for India
Weightlifters at the 2006 Commonwealth Games
Indian female weightlifters
Living people
1980 births
Weightlifters at the 2010 Commonwealth Games
People from Imphal West district
Sportswomen from Manipur
Weightlifters at the 2012 Summer Olympics
Olympic weightlifters of India
Recipients of the Arjuna Award
Weightlifters at the 2010 Asian Games
Commonwealth Games medallists in weightlifting
21st-century Indian women
21st-century Indian people
Weightlifters from Manipur
Asian Games competitors for India
20th-century Indian women
Medallists at the 2010 Commonwealth Games